Bilyutay (Büliuute) is a rural locality (a selo) in Bichursky District, Republic of Buryatia, Russia. The population was 438 as of 2017. There are 5 streets.

Geography 
Bilyutay is located 58 km northwest of Bichura (the district's administrative centre) by road. Nizhny Mangirtuy is the nearest rural locality.

References 

Rural localities in Bichursky District